"Bed Among the Lentils" is a dramatic monologue written by Alan Bennett in 1987 for television, as part of his Talking Heads series for the BBC. The series became very popular, moving onto BBC Radio, international theatre, becoming one of the best-selling audio book releases of all time and included as part of both the A-level and GCSE English syllabus. It was the third episode of the first series of Talking Heads.

Synopsis
Susan (Maggie Smith) is the wife of a vicar, living in a small village near Leeds. Her husband is a popular local figure, well respected and he also seems to collect adoring middle aged and elderly women because of his status as the vicar, all of whom fuss and fawn over him and seem to passive aggressively compete with Susan for his time and affection.
Susan is bored with her husband and unhappy with her life, although she is passive in this unhappiness other than her alcoholism. She has run up a debt with the local shop because of her constant buying of sherry, she dislikes the community she lives in and only gives the bare minimum of attention to her own parish duties as the vicar's wife.
During a difficult afternoon trying to arrange the church flowers with several of the other women, Susan goes into the church's backroom and drinks the communion wine hidden in the cupboard. She then returns to the others, challenges one of the flower arrangements that includes spiky teasels and ends up falling down the altar stairs and hitting her head. The women take this opportunity to take Susan home, fuss over her husband and look through everything in the house under pretext of getting the vicar his lunch and "helping" Susan.
On the next Sunday service, the vicar discovers the loss of the wine and has to celebrate the host in a bottle of Benylin, which Susan says will be fine since it is red, sweet and sticky. Susan starts buying her sherry from Ramesh, an Asian grocer in Leeds who is young, attractive and talks to her about his culture and life: he is married, but his wife is under 16, so not permitted to join him in England. The Bishop comes to lunch and Susan accidentally spills evaporated milk on him. A lock has been put on the communion wine cupboard in the vestry.
During another visit to Ramesh, Susan begins an affair with him and finally discovers some happiness and enjoyment in life, until Ramesh asks her if the reason she drinks is his colour or because she has a problem with alcohol.
This pushes Susan towards recovery: she begins to attend AA meetings, and attempts to be more honest with her husband. Ramesh returns to India to bring his wife home, selling his shop so that they can begin elsewhere. The vicar thinks that God is responsible for Susan's recovery, and his Bishop recommends him for a higher position in the church thanks to his "knowing what trials parishioners face". Susan remains passive, knowing that her recovery is due to Ramesh, and that God and her husband have little to do with it.

See also 

 English A-Level and GCSE

References

External links
Episode details

BBC television dramas
British plays
BBC Radio 7 (rebranded) programmes